Brian Jeffrey Feldman (born February 4, 1961) is an American politician and a member of the State Senate in the State of Maryland, representing district 15 in western and northern Montgomery County. He previously served in the Maryland House of Delegates. Before election to office, Feldman was an attorney with the United States Department of Justice and currently is in private practice.

Education 
Feldman received a Bachelor of Science degree in accounting from Penn State University, a Juris Doctor from the University of Pittsburgh School of Law, and a master's degree in Government from Johns Hopkins University. He currently serves as an adjunct professor at both Johns Hopkins and the University of Maryland, teaching graduate courses on state policymaking, federalism and healthcare policy.

In the legislature
Feldman currently serves as Chair of the Senate Committee on Education, Energy, and the Environment.  Previously, he was the Vice-Chair of the Senate Finance Committee.

Career
From 1988 to 2001, Brian served as an attorney with the U.S. Department of Justice, Tax Division, where he was a 3-time recipient of the Justice Department's prestigious "Outstanding Attorney Award." Prior to his service with the Department of Justice, Brian worked as an Attorney/CPA at Price Waterhouse.

Brian J. Feldman was first elected in 2002 to represent the 15th Legislative District in the Maryland House of Delegates and was re-elected in 2006 and 2010. In the House, Brian served on the House Economic Matters Committee and chaired its Banking, Economic Development, Science and Technology Subcommittee.

In 2008, Brian was elected by Maryland voters to serve as an Obama Delegate to the Democratic National Convention. He was subsequently selected to serve as an Advisor to the Obama Department of Justice Transition Team.

After the 2010 election, Speaker Mike Busch appointed Brian to the leadership position of House Parliamentarian. He also served as the House Chair of the Joint Information Technology and Biotechnology Committee and Chair of the Montgomery County House Delegation from 2007-2012.

In September 2013, Brian was appointed to the Maryland State Senate to fill a seat vacated by Senator Rob Garagiola. In 2014, Brian was appointed to serve on the Metropolitan Washington Council of Government’s Board of Directors. Also in 2014, Brian joined the Board of Directors of Montgomery Hospice. In 2014, he was elected to a full 4-year term in the Maryland State Senate and then re-elected in 2018 and 2022. Brian serves as Chair of the Senate Committee on Education, Energy, and the Environment. Previously, he was the Vice-Chair of the Senate Finance Committee.

He currently practices law with a Maryland law firm that specializes in tax litigation and tax controversies. Brian is the only Attorney/CPA in the Maryland General Assembly.

During his tenure in the General Assembly, Feldman has sponsored legislation promoting clean energy and the creation of green jobs, improved the region’s transportation infrastructure, grew Maryland's biotechnology sector, and improved the electric service provider reliability. Feldman serves as Co-Chair of Maryland’s Health Insurance Coverage Protection Commission.

Feldman has earned several awards for his work in politics and as an attorney, including Advocate of the Year from the Technology Council of Maryland, Legislator of the Year by the Montgomery County Chamber of Commerce and the National State Legislator of the Year by the Biotechnology Industry Organization. He also received three Outstanding Attorney Awards from the U.S. Justice Department.

Legislative notes
Voted for the Clean Indoor Air Act of 2007 (HB359)
Voted for the Healthy Air Act in 2006(SB154)
Voted against slots in 2005 (HB1361)
Voted in favor of in-state tuition for illegal immigrants in 2007 (HB6)

Election results

2018 Race for Maryland State Senate – District 15
Voters to choose one:
{| class="wikitable"
|-
!Name
!Votes
!Percent
!Outcome
|-
|"Brian J. Feldman", Democrat
|38,771
|  72.0%
|   Won
|-
|David Wilson, Republican
|15,000
|  27.9%
|   Lost
|}

2014 Race for Maryland State Senate – District 15
Voters to choose one:
{| class="wikitable"
|-
!Name
!Votes
!Percent
!Outcome
|-
|"Brian J. Feldman", Democrat
|19,925
|  60.4%
|   Won
|-
|Robin Ficker, Republican
|13,028
|  39.5%
|   Lost
|}

2006 Race for Maryland House of Delegates – District 15
Voters to choose three:
{| class="wikitable"
|-
!Name
!Votes
!Percent
!Outcome
|-
|Kathleen M. Dumais, Democrat
|25,781
|  21.6%
|   Won
|-
|Brian J. Feldman, Democrat
|25,760
|  21.6%
|   Won
|-
|Craig L. Rice, Democrat
|20,202
|  17.0%
|   Won
|-
|Jean B. Cryor, Republican
|20,050
|  16.8%
|   Lost
|-
|Brian Mezger, Republican
|14,112
|  11.8%
|   Lost
|- 
|Chris Pilkerton, Republican
|13,174
|  11.1%
|   Lost
|}

2002 Race for Maryland House of Delegates – District 15
Voters to choose three:
{| class="wikitable"
|-
!Name
!Votes
!Percent
!Outcome
|-
|Jean B. Cryor, Republican
|20,584
|  18.7%
|   Won
|-
|Brian J. Feldman, Democrat
|19,719
|  17.9%
|   Won
|-
|Kathleen M. Dumais, Democrat
|19,246
|  17.5%
|   Won
|-
|John Young, Democrat
|17,358
|  15.8%
|   Lost
|-
|William Ferner Askinazi, Republican
|16,693
|  15.2%
|   Lost
|- 
|Mary Kane, Republican
|16,579
|  15.0%
|   Lost
|-
|Other Write-Ins
|42
|  0.0%
|   Lost
|}

References

External links
Official website
Maryland State Legislature website

1961 births
Living people
Democratic Party members of the Maryland House of Delegates
Politicians from Pittsburgh
People from Potomac, Maryland
21st-century American politicians
Democratic Party Maryland state senators